Frederika Alexis Cull (born 5 October 1999) is an Indonesian-Australian actress, model, activist and beauty pageant titleholder who won the title of Puteri Indonesia 2019 representing DKI Jakarta 1. She represented Indonesia at the Miss Universe 2019 pageant, where she placed in the Top 10. Frederika became the seventh Indonesian, and the first representative of Jakarta SCR to be placed as a finalist in Miss Universe history.

Early life and education
Cull was born in Jakarta, Indonesia, but at the age of 1 until 7 years old she was living in her father hometown, Gold Coast, Queensland, Australia. Cull was born to a British-English born Australian father, Roy Alexis Cull and an Indonesian step-mother, Yuliar Markonah Peers. Frederika moved to Jakarta, Indonesia at the age of seven to pursue her study and modeling career, also she started her foray in acting career at age of 14.

Frederika finish her college study at Australian Independent School Indonesia (AIS Indonesia) in Jakarta, Indonesia. and she took up her bachelor degree Hons. in Economics and Management studies in The Oxford Centre for Management Studies (OCMS) - Saïd Business School of the University of Oxford in Oxford, Oxfordshire, England, and Entrepreneurship Summer Course Program in the same university as well.

Puteri Indonesia 2019 
Cull started her foray into the world of pageantry when she competed at the 22nd Puteri Indonesia pageant representing Jakarta SCR, she ended up crowned Puteri Indonesia 2019 at the finals held at the Jakarta Convention Center, on 8 March 2019 by the outgoing titleholder of Puteri Indonesia 2018 and Top 20 Miss Universe 2018, Sonia Fergina Citra of Bangka Belitung.

Miss Universe 2019 
Cull represented Indonesia at the 68th edition of the Miss Universe 2019 pageant on 8 December 2019 at the Tyler Perry Studios in Atlanta, Georgia, where she placed in the top 10. She is the first Indonesian representative to ever place in the top 10.  Cull became the seventh Indonesian and the first representative of Jakarta SCR to be placed as a semifinalist in Miss Universe history.

Filmography
Cull has acted in several television films.

Television films

Gallery

See also 

 Puteri Indonesia 2019
 Miss Universe 2019
 Jolene Marie Cholock-Rotinsulu
 Jesica Fitriana Martasari

References

External links

 
 

Living people
1999 births
Puteri Indonesia winners
Miss Universe 2019 contestants
Child activists
Education activists
Open access activists
Indonesian human rights activists
Indonesian beauty pageant winners
Indonesian Christians
Indonesian female models
Indonesian film actresses
Indonesian female athletes
Indonesian female mixed martial artists
Indonesian female kickboxers
Actresses from Jakarta
Actresses from the Gold Coast, Queensland
Sportspeople from the Gold Coast, Queensland
People from the Gold Coast, Queensland
Indo people
Indonesian people of Australian descent
Indonesian people of British descent
Indonesian people of English descent
Australian people of British descent
Australian Christians
Australian people of Indonesian descent
Australian people of English descent
Australian actresses of Asian descent